{{Infobox automobile
| name = Škoda Roomster (5J)
| image = Skoda Roomster front 20091212.jpg
| manufacturer = Škoda Auto
| aka = Skoda Praktik (panel van)
| production = 2006–2015
| assembly = Czech Republic: Kvasiny (2006–2011, 2013–2015); Vrchlabí (2011–2013)Ukraine : Solomonovo (Eurocar)Russia: Kaluga
| class = Small family car (Roomster)Panel van (Praktik)
| body_style = 5-door MPV5-door panel van
| platform = Volkswagen Group A04 (PQ24) platform (front)Volkswagen Group A4 (PQ34) (rear)
| layout = Front-engine, front-wheel-drive
| engine = 1.2 L I3 HTP (petrol)1.2 L I4 TSI (petrol)1.4 L I4 16V (petrol)1.6 L I4 16V (petrol)1.2 L I3 TDI CR (diesel)1.4 L I3 TDI PD (diesel)1.6 L I4 TDI CR (diesel)1.9 L I4 TDI PD (diesel)
| transmission = 5-speed manual6-speed tiptronic7-speed DSG
| wheelbase = 
| length = 
| width = 
| height = 
| weight = 
| designer = Thomas Ingenlath
| successor = Škoda Yeti
| predecessor = Škoda 1203SEAT Inca (indirect)
| sp = uk
| related = Škoda Fabia Mk2
}}

The Škoda Roomster ('Type 5J) is a small family car manufactured and marketed by Škoda Auto from 2006 to 2015 over a single generation with a single intermediate facelift. It has a five-door, five passenger, front-engine, front-wheel drive, high-roof design and has been described as a hatchback, an estate car, or a multi-purpose vehicle. Styled by Thomas Ingenlath and Peter Wouda, the Roomster premiered at the 2006 Geneva Motor Show) as the first car marketed after Volkswagen Group's takeover of Skoda, sharing the A4 (PQ34) platform and components with the second generation Škoda Fabia.

Assembled at the Škoda factory in Kvasiny, Rychnov nad Kněžnou District, sales began in June 2006.  A five-door, two-seater panel van variant launched in March 2007 as the Škoda Praktik.Overview

The Roomster is based on the concept car of the same name, announced in September 2003 at the Frankfurt Auto Show. The concept was slightly shorter –  against  – than the production model with a longer wheelbase –  against , and featured a single rear sliding door on the passenger side, which was replaced by two conventionally-hinged swinging rear doors.

The Roomster's cargo arrangement is marketed as VarioFlex, with 40–20–40 split rear seats that can move longitudinally or transversely (by removing the middle seat), recline up to 7°, fold forward — or be removed to form a flat load surface.  The load surface can raised or lowered .

At launch, the Škoda Roomster used four-stroke engines from the Volkswagen Group. The 1.6-litre was also available with a tiptronic six-speed automatic transmission.

The Roomster could combine standard body colours (both solid and metallic) with a white, black, or silver roof. An offroad-styled Scout trim level was introduced late 2006. A single piece panoramic sunroof is optional.

Facelift
A facelifted Roomster premiered at the 2010 Geneva Motor Show with a revised front fascia and fog lights. Inside, the facelift featured a revised steering wheel.  Headlights elements were revised with their housing.

1.2-litre TSI turbocharged petrol engines came as a replacement of the previous 1.4- and 1.6-litre MPI engines, providing significant improvements to fuel consumption and corresponding reductions in  emissions.

The Aisin automatic transmission previously used was also replaced with the seven speed dual-clutch Direct-Shift Gearbox (DSG) (optional on  1.2 TSi models), providing a reduction of over 30% in  emissions for the  automatic derivative (compared to the previous 1.6-litre). Diesel engines were updated to the common rail system and four valve technology.

The design of the Roomster Scout also evolved (front bumpers, front fog lights).

Related models
Skoda marketed from 2007 a five-door, two-seater panel van version of the Roomster called the Škoda Praktik (Typ 5J8)'''. It also includes a moveable internal load bulked, 'hidden' underfloor storage, anti slip load bay floor covering with six lashing points, and full length roof rails.

The model was targeted at Central and Eastern Europe. The Praktik was facelifted in 2010, just as the Roomster.

Engines
Overview of engines available for the Roomster (Typ 5J), incl. Praktik and facelifted model.

Petrol engines

Diesel engines

References

External links

Škoda Roomster  – Škoda UK Website
BRISKODA.net – Škoda Roomster Forum and Community
Roomster Toronto

Roomster
Euro NCAP small MPVs
Mini MPVs
Vans
Front-wheel-drive vehicles
Cars introduced in 2006
2010s cars
Cars of the Czech Republic